Ghawazi (also ghawazee) are female dancers who dance in return for money; the male equivalent is khawal. While the performative and traditional raqs sharqi in urban Egypt was more classical and influenced by more formal and classical Western styles such as classical ballet or Latin American dance, the term ghawazi in Egypt refers to the dancers in rural Egypt who have preserved the traditional 18th- to 19th-century styles.

The practice began as a few Egyptian Domari refused to dance for free, unlike the custom among all Egypt. Rural Egyptians or Fellahin adopted the practice, developing a more rural and traditional style accompanied by rural Egyptian songs and the colorful dresses of the Fellahin, becoming a theme of rural Egypt. 

Over the years, Upper Egyptians (Sa'idis) mastered and then developed a different style of traditional Saidi dancing that is accompanied by the Egyptian mizmar and Qena and Assuit's traditional female clothing of Telli , a silky type of local fabric. That Upper Egyptian style is the most famous, in which the dancer is accompanied by a traditional Upper Egyptian mizmar and a singer singing and narrating folk songs in Saidi Arabic about local heroes and popular love stories in towns.

Traditional Ghawazi dancers are becoming harder and harder to find as time passes. There are main movements and positioning of two of the most popular Ghawazi groups that are found in modern Egypt; the Banat Mazin of Luxor and the Sumbati Ghawazee of the Nile Delta. The Banat Mazin are famous for their traditional Upper Egyptian vintage-style costume, so you can see how the movements would be affected by the costuming. The Sagat (finger cymbals), are optional but recommended in the Upper Egyptian/Saidi style.

Name
[[File:167 Egyptian types and scenes - Arab Dancing Girls.jpg|thumb|Postcard photograph of two dancing girls posing in a dance costume with the name of "Egyptian types and scenes  (c. 1900).]]

The Arabic  ghawāzī (singular  ghāziya) means "conqueror", as the ghaziya is said to "conquer" the hearts of her audience. They were also known as awālim (singular alma, transliterated almeh in French as almée), but in Egypt, Awalim are the traditional Egyptian dancers and singers of the city, not rural areas, who used to perform in respectable events such as the weddings and festivities of notable people.

Both terms are 19th-century euphemisms for "erotic dancer"; almeh literally means "learned woman" and came to be used as a replacement for ghaziya after the ghawazi were legally banned in 1834.

An almeh originally was a courtesan in Egyptian culture, a woman educated to sing and recite classical poetry and to discourse. After the ghawazi were banned, they were forced to pretend that they were in fact awalim. The term almeh was introduced in French Orientalism as almée and used synonymously with "belly dancer".

History
In 1834, the ghawazi were banished from Cairo to Upper Egypt by Muhammad Ali. Initially, the Ghawazi were a very small group who were banished because of their low-class dancing. By the time of their banishment the term had become a general term for any dancers as it included all the traditional and folk dances of Rural and Upper Egyptians, mainly featuring mizmars and heavy bass lines and other traditional Egyptian music in the background.

Beginning in the first half of the 19th century, descriptions and depictions of ghawazi dancers became famous in European Orientalism, and the style was described as danse de ventre or belly-dance from the 1860s.

The first Ghawazis performed unveiled in the streets. Rapid hip movement and use of brass finger cymbals/hand castanets characterized their dance. Musicians of their tribe usually accompanied them in their dance. They usually wore kohl around their eyes and henna on their fingers, palms, toes and feet. 

The Ghawazi performed in the court of a house, or in the street, before the door, on certain occasions of festivity in the harem. They were never admitted into a respectable harem, but were frequently hired to entertain a party of men in the house of some rake. Both women and men enjoyed their entertainment. However, many people who were more religious, or of the higher classes, disapproved of them.

Many people liked the dancing of the Ghawazi, but felt it was improper because of its being danced by women who should not expose themselves in this manner. Because of this, there was a small number of young male performers called Khawals. The Khawals were Egyptian male traditional dancers who impersonated the women of the Ghawazi and their dance. They were known to impersonate every aspect of the women including their dance and use of castanets.

The word khawal in Egypt is modern derogatory slang for a man participating in passive gay intercourse.

Contemporary practitioners
Representing diverse historical backgrounds, most of the Ghawazi of the Qena region belong to ethnic minorities such as the Nawar (or Nawara), Halab and Bahlawen.

Particularly well known are the Banat Maazin family, Nawar people who settled in Luxor and were filmed in the 70s and 80s. Many consider the Maazin family to be the only practicing family left of the original line of Ghawazi dancers.

Influence on Western belly-dance

The style of dance and costuming of the Ghawazi has been especially influential in crafting the look of American Tribal Style Belly Dance. The Gypsy Ghawazi dress consists of an Ottoman coat with slits, known as a Yelek or entari. The abdomen is covered by these coats. Turkish harem pants are worn under these coats. The coats are typically ankle-length, though some modern Ghawazi troupes wear a shorter version over a full, knee-length skirt. Ghawazi dancers often adorn their heads with elaborate headresses, with dancers often accompanying themselves by playing zils, or small cymbals that are used by dancers in many forms of Middle Eastern dance.

The Egyptian Ghawazi costumes worn by rural and upper Egyptians are more richly colored. In Rural Egypt, the traditional female dancing dress is floral and fluffy; the dancers typically choose different colors, each dancer usually wearing a different color from the one next to her.

In the Upper Egyptian style, the dancers wear the popular Saidi Telli dress, a black and glittery traditional Egyptian dress. The main dancers are accompanied by Saidi music, mainly the Egyptian flute and traditional Saidi songs narrating stories about the beauty of Qena, Assuit, Minya and their traditions.

References

Further reading
Karin van Nieuwkerk, “Changing Images and Shifting Identities: Female Performers in Egypt” pp 136–143 in Moving History/Dancing Cultures: A Dance History Reader'' (2001), Dils, Ann and Ann Cooper Albright (eds) Wesleyan University Press, Durham, North Carolina, 

Egyptian folklore 
Upper Egypt   
Egyptian dances 
Egyptian dancers 
Egyptian clothing 
Belly dance 
 
Egyptian culture 
North African culture 
Middle Eastern culture